Chenopodium oahuense is a species of flowering plant in the amaranth family known by the common names aweoweo, alaweo, alaweo huna, aheahea, ahea, ahewahewa, and kahaihai. It is endemic to Hawaii, where it occurs on all of the larger islands except for Kahoolawe. It is also found on Lisianski Island, Laysan, the French Frigate Shoals, Necker Island, and Nihoa.

This species is a shrub that can reach 5 to 20 meters in height. The fleshy, lightly hairy leaf blades have three lobes. The inflorescence is a panicle of small flowers.

This plant can be used for Hawaiian ecosystem restoration and erosion control. Sooty terns and red-footed boobies use this plant as nesting material. The Hawaiian people used the wood of this plant to make shark hooks, and the cooked leaves were eaten like (related) spinach.

References

External links
USDA Plants Profile

oahuense
Endemic flora of Hawaii
Biota of Hawaii (island)
Biota of Kauai
Biota of Lanai
Biota of Maui
Biota of Molokai
Biota of Oahu
Plants described in 1835